Julio César Borboa García (born 12 August 1969) is a Mexican former professional boxer. He is a former NABF and the IBF Super Flyweight Champion.

Professional career
In November 1992, Borboa beat an undefeated and future WBO world Bantamweight Champion, African Alfred Kotey to earn his first title shot.

IBF Super Flyweight Championship
On May 31, 1997 Julio César won the IBF Super Flyweight Championship by upsetting the undefeated Robert Quiroga by T.K.O. in the twelfth round. His second defense was against another undefeated fighter Joel Luna Zárate, Borboa won a twelve round decision.

See also
List of Mexican boxing world champions
List of IBF world champions
List of super flyweight boxing champions

References

External links

Boxers from Sonora
People from Guaymas
World boxing champions
International Boxing Federation champions
World flyweight boxing champions
Super-flyweight boxers
1969 births
Living people
Mexican male boxers